An all-time medal table for all European Games from 2015, is tabulated below. The EOC itself does not publish all-time tables, and publishes unofficial tables only per single Games. 

The results are attributed to the IOC country code as currently displayed by the IOC database. Usually, a single code corresponds to a single National Olympic Committee (NOC).

The medal table is based on information provided by the International Olympic Committee (IOC) and is consistent with IOC convention in its published medal tables. By default, the table is ordered by the number of gold medals the athletes from a nation have won, where nation is an entity represented by a National Olympic Committee (NOC). The number of silver medals is taken into consideration next and then the number of bronze medals. If nations are still tied, equal ranking is given and they are listed alphabetically.

All-time  medal table 
 

Six member nations of the European Olympic Committees have as yet failed to win any medals: Albania, Andorra, Iceland, Liechtenstein, Malta and Monaco. Several of these nations compete in the EOC event for smaller NOCs, the Games of the Small States of Europe.

See also
 2015 European Games medal table
 2019 European Games medal table
 List of 2015 European Games medal winners

References

External links 
 Official website